Ma Chao-chun (Pinyin: Mǎ Chāojùn; 1886–1977) was the mayor of Nanjing in the period prior to the Battle of Nanking. On December 1, 1937, Ma Chao-chun ordered all Chinese citizens remaining in Nanking to move into the Nanking Safety Zone. Ma fled the city on December 7, and the International Committee took over as the de facto government of Nanjing.

He died in Taipei at age 91.

References 

Republic of China politicians from Guangdong
Mayors of Nanjing
People from Taishan, Guangdong
Kuomintang politicians in Taiwan
1886 births
1977 deaths
Politicians from Jiangmen